Aye Aye Aung (born 19 February 1995) is a middle-distance runner from Myanmar. She competed in the Women's 800 metres event at the 2015 World Championships in Athletics in Beijing, China.

See also
 Myanmar at the 2015 World Championships in Athletics

References

1995 births
Living people
Place of birth missing (living people)
Burmese female middle-distance runners
World Athletics Championships athletes for Myanmar